Phoenix is an unincorporated community in Yazoo County, Mississippi, United States.

References

Unincorporated communities in Yazoo County, Mississippi
Unincorporated communities in Mississippi